In the CPBL, players born outside of Taiwan are often known as international players. This list includes all international players who are currently on CPBL extended rosters and thus eligible to play in the CPBL or in the CPBL 2. As the league has a limit on foreign players in each organisation (maximum of five foreign players at any given time), there are currently just 23 active players on CPBL extended rosters, 18 of whom are pitchers. 

List is accurate as of April 3, 2022:

References

Lists of baseball players